The German Beauty Homer is a breed of fancy pigeon developed over many years of selective breeding, from German racing pigeons. German Beauty Homers along with other varieties of domesticated pigeons are all descendants of the rock dove (Columba livia). The breed was first developed around one hundred years ago.

See also

 List of pigeon breeds

References

Pigeon breeds
Pigeon racing
Pigeon breeds originating in Germany